Clive Travers Stephen (10 November 1889–1957) was an Australian sculptor, painter in water-colour and oils, printmaker, and medical doctor.

Early life 
Clive Stephen was born in Caulfield on 10 November 1889, the son of Blanche (née Travers) and Sidney James Henry Stephen, a solicitor, of 'The Pines' in Middle Crescent, Brighton.

Physician 
Stephen studied medicine at the University of Melbourne in Ormond College, entered third year in 1912, and attained the Bachelor of Medicine and Bachelor of Surgery with Third Class Honours in 1914. He was resident medical officer of the Alfred Hospital

World War I 
Stephen enlisted in the Royal Army Medical Corps in England and was posted to the 14th General Hospital, Wimereux, near Boulogne, in the north of France. Stephen publicly promoted the cause of the Red Cross. He was made an Army Captain in March 1915, and in mid-1916 was married in Chichester. His brother, Lieutenant K. T. Stephen was killed in France in May 1918.

Post-war 
Stephen lived in Elmore and practised medicine in Central Victoria, and was Public Vaccinator for the Northern District during the Influenza Epidemic. There his wife, Dorothy Edna, bore a son in 1918. He left the district in February 1919 to live in High St., Prahran and later at 537 Malvern Rd., Toorak. During WW2 Stephen served in the Citizen Military Forces.

Artist

Training 
Stephen attended George Bell's Saturday afternoon classes at Selborne Road 1925–30,  but otherwise was a self-taught painter and sculptor. His background as a doctor, and as nephew of Chief Justice Sir John and Lady Madden and a relative by marriage of the late Mrs Ellis Rowan, was noted in an Argus newspaper article on "Artists' Aliases".

Reception 
When in 1933 he exhibited with other students of Bell and Arnold Shore's school, Blamire Young commented that "Clive Stephen ... has a sound method of putting a design together. His colored drawings are rich and full of promise." During the same period, Stephen and his wife Dorothy, a painter, conducted life-classes that attracted such artists as Will Dyson, and others in the nascent modern movement in Melbourne. In the late 1930s he exhibited with the association of Modernist sculptors formed in 1935 by Ola Cohn, who named themselves The Plastic Group, and he also showed with Group Twelve.

McCulloch attributes influences on Stephen to primitive sculpture via European artists such as Jacob Epstein and Henri Gaudier-Brzeska, resulting in his abstraction. He was one of the first Australian stone-carvers thus inspired. Gino Nibbi in Art in Australia of 1939 notes that he; "...tends by culture and temperament towards abstract art. After searching, let us say, on the surface of his material, by carving its external coat, he begins now to cut it, to excavate into it, to free from it some secret, without which sculpture is in danger of remaining at the bas-relief stage, and of being too elusive. Stephen is a gifted artist showing great potentiality of further development."

Legacy 
Stephen was also an ardent collector; as early as 1934 he acquired Head of a woman (1933), painted in Bali by Ian Fairweather (likewise an artist influenced by the primitives), which he gifted to the National Gallery of Victoria in 1948.

Though he was an artist of great energy and enthusiasm, soon after retiring from medicine to devote his life to sculpture, tragically Stephen died in 1957.

Collections 

 National Gallery of Australia
 National Gallery of Victoria
 Art Gallery of New South Wales
 Queensland Art Gallery
 Art Gallery of Western Australia

Exhibitions 

 1939, 30 May – 10 June: Plastic Group – sculpture and drawings. With Ola Cohn, Edith Hughston, Moya Carey, Ethel Reynolds, Val Blogg, M. McChesney Matthews, C. de Gruchy, Nellie Patterson. Victorian Artists' Society Gallery, East Melbourne
 1937, 7–18 September: Plastic Group – an exhibition of sculpture, with Ola Cohn, Nellie Patterson, Moya Carey, Christine de Gruchy, Val Blogg, M. McChesney Matthews, Reg. Cordia, Edith Moore, the late John K. Blogg, Michael O'Connell. Hogan's Gallery, 340 Little Collins Street, Melbourne
 1936, June: Group Twelve. Athenaeum Gallery
 1933, July: Students of George Bell's and Arnold Shore, Atheneum Gallery

Posthumous 

 2012, McClelland Sculpture Park + Gallery
 1996, from 28 April: Clive Stephen : sculpture & works on paper, including works in oil and on paper by Dorothy Stephen. Eastgate Gallery
 1992: Classical Modernism: The George Bell Circle, National Gallery of Victoria
 1991, 17–28 April: The George Bell Group exhibition. A tribute to George Bell. Eastgate Gallery, 729 High St., Armadale
 1988: The Great Australian Art Exhibition
 1986: Frances Derham, Ethel Spowers and Clive Stephens. Jim Alexander Gallery, 13 Elmo Road, East Malvern
 1980-1: Melbourne woodcuts and linocuts of the 1920's and 1930's. Ballarat Fine Art Gallery travelling exhibition curated by Roger Butler. Toured by AGDC to McClelland Art Gallery, University of Queensland Art Gallery, Newcastle Region Art Gallery, Victorian College of the Arts Gallery, Ballarat Fine Art Gallery
 1978: Clive Stephen, sculptor. Gryphon Gallery
 1959, from 10 February: Memorial exhibition,  National Gallery of Victoria

References 

1889 births
1957 deaths
Australian medical doctors
Australian sculptors
Australian military doctors
20th-century surgeons
Australian male artists